is a Japanese manga series written and illustrated by Kouji Mori. It was serialized in Hakusensha's seinen manga magazine Young Animal from October 2000 to May 2008, with its chapters collected in 18 tankōbon volumes.

Media

Manga
Hakusensha collected its chapters in eighteen tankōbon volumes, released from June 29, 2001, to July 29, 2008.

Volume list

Drama
Holyland was adapted into a 13-episode Japanese television drama, which was broadcast on TV Tokyo in 2005.

A 4-episode Korean television drama adaptation was broadcast from April 28 to May 19, 2012.

Notes

References

External links
  
  
 

2005 Japanese television series debuts
2005 Japanese television series endings
Hakusensha manga
Japanese television dramas based on manga
Manga adapted into television series
Martial arts anime and manga
Seinen manga
TV Tokyo original programming